Decision lists are a representation for Boolean functions which can be easily learnable from examples.  Single term decision lists are more expressive than disjunctions and conjunctions; however, 1-term decision lists are less expressive than the general disjunctive normal form and the conjunctive normal form.

The language specified by a k-length decision list includes as a subset the language specified by a k-depth decision tree.

Learning decision lists can be used for attribute efficient learning.

Definition 

A decision list (DL) of length  is of the form:

 if  then 
     output 
 else if  then
     output 
 ...
 else if  then
     output 

The last if-then-else is the default case, which means formula  is always equal to true. A -DL is a decision list where all of formulas have at most  terms. Sometimes "decision list" is used to refer to a 1-DL, where all of the formulas are either a variable or its negation.

See also 
 Decision stump

References

Machine learning